The Haier Presents Gold One Day Cup 2014–15 is the thirty edition started in 1985–86 is the premier List A cricket domestic competition in Pakistan, which was held from 19 January 2015 to 1 February 2015.

Venue

Fixtures and Results
All times shown are in Pakistan Standard Time (UTC+05).

Group stage

Group I
Points Table Source:Cricinfo

References

National One Day Championship seasons